General elections were held in Palau in 1996 to elect a President, Vice-President, Senate and House of Delegates. The first round of the presidential election took place on 24 September, whilst the run-off election and the election for the House of Delegates and Senate took place on 5 November. All candidates ran as independents, with 36 candidates contesting the 14 Senate seats and 35 for the 16 House of Delegates seats Incumbent Kuniwo Nakamura was re-elected President, whilst Thomas Remengesau Jr. was re-elected Vice-President. Voter turnout was 77% in the presidential elections on 24 September and 81% on 5 November.

Results

President
Toribiong withdrew his candidacy prior to the second round following his poor performance compared to 1992 and the collapse of the Koror-Babeldaob Bridge, which Toribiong stated should receive the government's full attention.

Vice-President

Senate

House of Delegates

References

Palau
1996 in Palau
Elections in Palau
Non-partisan elections
Presidential elections in Palau